Sir William Brouncker (c. 1547 – 1596) was an English barrister and member of parliament.

He was the eldest son of Henry Brouncker of Melksham and Erlestoke and was trained in the law at the Middle Temple (1566). He succeeded his father in 1568 and was knighted in 1592.

He was elected a Member (MP) of the Parliament of England for Westbury in 1572 and 1584 and for Wiltshire in 1586, 1589 and 1593. He was a member of the Wiltshire bench as a Justice of the Peace from 1573 and appointed High Sheriff of Wiltshire for 1581–82.

He married Martha, the daughter of Sir Walter Mildmay, and had one son and four daughters.

References

 

1540s births
1596 deaths
High Sheriffs of Wiltshire
English MPs 1572–1583
English MPs 1584–1585
English MPs 1586–1587
English MPs 1589
English MPs 1593
Members of the Parliament of England for constituencies in Wiltshire
People from Melksham